Lya Ley (1899–1992) was an Austrian-born film actress of the silent era. She was built up into a star by the director Franz Hofer.

Selected filmography
 Rose on the Heath (1916)
 Der Verheiratete Junggeselle (1918)
 Hängezöpfchen (1919)
 Der Christus von Oberammergau (1921)

References

Bibliography
 Bock, Hans-Michael & Bergfelder, Tim. The Concise CineGraph. Encyclopedia of German Cinema. Berghahn Books, 2009.

External links

1899 births
1992 deaths
Austrian film actresses
People from Opava
Austrian emigrants to Germany